The Banjo Lesson is an 1893 oil painting by African-American artist Henry Ossawa Tanner.  The painting has elements of American Realism and of French Impressionism.  It depicts two African-Americans in a humble domestic setting: an old black man is teaching a young boy – possibly his grandson – to play the banjo.  It has been held by Hampton University since 1894.

Background
Tanner was born in Pittsburgh in 1859 and grew up in Philadelphia.  His mother was born as a slave in Virginia and escaped through the Underground Railroad; his father was a free-born black minister in the African Methodist Episcopal Church and became a bishop in 1888.  After studying with Thomas Eakins at the Pennsylvania Academy of the Fine Arts from 1879, where he was one of its first black students, Tanner ran a photography business in Atlanta, Georgia, from 1889, and taught drawing at Clark College.  His business was not a success, and he left to study in Rome in 1891, sponsored by Bishop Joseph Crane Hartzell of the (white) Methodist Episcopal Church.  Tanner settled in Paris, where he studied at the Académie Julian from 1891, studying with Jean-Léon Gérôme, Jean-Joseph Benjamin-Constant and Jean-Paul Laurens.  

This work was made after Tanner returned temporarily to the US in 1893 to recuperate after suffering from typhoid fever.  He spent some time in the Appalachian Mountains in North Carolina, and spoke at the Congress on Africa at the 1893 World's Columbian Exposition in Chicago.  One possible influence on the work was Paul Laurence Dunbar's poem "A Banjo Song", included in his first book Oak and Ivy printed in small edition privately in 1892 when the poet was aged 20, and which Dunbar may have recited at the World's Columbian Exposition.  Tanner wrote of himself (using the third person): "To his mind any of the artists who have represented Negro life have only seen the comic, the ludicrous side of it, and have lacked sympathy and appreciation for the warm big heart that dwells within such a rough exterior." It is not clear if the painting was made in Philadelphia (there is a suggestion it or a study was exhibited there in early 1894), or perhaps completed after he arrived back in Paris.

The genre painting is based on an illustration that Tanner drew while in the US, for the short story "Uncle Tim's Compromise on Christmas" by Ruth McEnery Stuart, published in December 1893 in Harper's Young People, volume 15, page 81. In the story, an old man (old Tim) gave his banjo, his only valuable possession, to the boy (little Tim) as a Christmas present, and the compromise was that they would share it.  "The only thing in the world that the old man held as a personal possession was his old banjo. It was the one thing the little boy counted on as a precious future property, and often, at all hours of the day or evening, old Tim could be seen sitting before the cabin, his arms around the boy, who stood between his knees, while, with eyes closed, he ran his withered fingers over the strings, picking out the tunes that best recalled the stories of olden days that he loved to tell into the little fellow's ear. And sometimes, holding the banjo steady, he would invite little Tim to try his tiny hands at picking the strings."

Description
The painting measures .  Tanner subverts stereotypical images of caricatured cheerful minstrels playing the banjo and dancing, and tropes of innate black musicality, portraying instead a calm and sentimental domestic scene with one generation passing on their knowledge and instructing another.  The painting depicts a grey-haired old man sitting on a chair in his sparsely furnished home, with the boy standing close before him between his spread legs holding the musical instrument.  Both are observing as the child carefully plucks the strings with one hand, while holding a chord with the other hand; the weight of the instrument is supported by the man.  In the background, some crockery and a loaf of bread are placed on a table or sideboard, with a few small pictures on the bare wall, a second chair, and a coat hanging beside a shelf.  In the foreground are some kindling and cooking vessels on the bare floorboards.  The scene is lit from two directions: a cold bluish light from a window to the left and a warmer yellow light from a fireplace to the right, both unseen.  The colour palette is dominated by humble, earthy tones, blacks, greys and browns, whites and yellows.  The setting is humble but not impoverished: there is a wooden floor not bare dirt, and the walls are plastered and decorated with two pictures not bare wood; the table has a clean tablecloth.  The two subjects are similar to those in Tanner's 1894 painting The Thankful Poor, which depicts the old man and young boy sitting at a table, praying before a meal.  Both paintings were based on staged photographs that Tanner took in Atlanta.   

Farisa Khalid draws explicit parallels with several Old Master paintings, including Domenico Ghirlandaio's c.1490 An Old Man and his Grandson, and Johannes Vermeer's c.1662-1663 Woman with a Lute, as well as the more contemporary peasant works of Jean-François Millet, such as his 1857-59 painting The Angelus.  Judith Wilson contends that Tanner "lifted what Du Bois would call 'the Veil of Race' to give art audiences an unprecedented 'inside look' at Afro-American culture".

Reception
Tanner returned to Paris, where The Banjo Lesson was his first work to be accepted at the Paris Salon in 1894 (an earlier work that he submitted in 1892, perhaps a version of The Bagpipe Lesson, had been rejected).  Despite his success, Tanner turned away from depictions of African-Americans, finding more critical and commercial success with landscape paintings and biblical scenes.  A retrospective exhibition in New York in 1908 did not include The Banjo Lesson.  

Tanner enlisted with the American Red Cross in France in 1917, and served as a lieutenant in ambulances in the First World War.  He was later awarded the French Legion d'Honneur for his war work.  Three of his paintings were bought by the French government for the Musée du Luxembourg, and these works - The Resurrection of Lazarus, The Disciples at Emmaus, and Christ and His Disciples on the Bethany Road - are now in the Musée d'Orsay. 

The extent to which Tanner continued to see himself as a black man, and the extent to which he "passed" in France, is debated.

As W.S Scarborough of Wilberforce College wrote in 1902, "When "The Banjo Lesson" appears, many of the friends of the race sincerely hoped that a portrayer of Negro life by a Negro artist had arisen indeed.  They hoped, too, that the treatment of race subjects by him would serve to counterbalance so much that has made the race only a laughingstock subject for those artists who see nothing in it but the most extravagantly absurd and grotesque.  But this was not to be."

The painting was bought by Robert Curtis Ogden, who donated it to the Hampton Institute (now Hampton University) in November 1894, and it remains in the collection of the Hampton University Museum, in Hampton, Virginia.  A similar painting The Bagpipe Lesson, 1892, depicting a youth practising to play the bagpipes beside a flowering apple tree in northern France, was also presented to the Hampton Institute in 1894; there is a study in the Smithsonian American Art Museum.

References

 Hampton University Museum, Hampton University
 ‘Real’ Experiences and Upended Stereotypes: Henry Ossawa Tanner’s Black Genre Scenes, Princeton University
 Artistic light and capturing the immeasurable, Polyxeni Potter, Emerg Infect Dis., 2008 Feb; 14(2): 360–361
 This Week’s Art: Henry Ossawa Tanner’s “The Banjo Lesson”, Russell Dickerson, 18 March 2018
 Cross-Curricular Connect: The Banjo Lesson, Charles McQuillen, 3 January 2016
 Farisa Khalid, "Henry Ossawa Tanner, The Banjo Lesson", Smarthistory, 9 September 2016
 "A Missing Question Mark: The Unknown Henry Ossawa Tanner", Will South, Nineteenth-Century Art Worldwide 8, no. 2 (Autumn 2009)
 Evidence in art: Tanner's The Banjo Lesson, David Byron, 8 January 2008
 "Lifting "The Veil": Henry O. Tanner's The Banjo Lesson and The Thankful Poor", Judith Wilson, Contributions in Black Studies: Vol. 9, Article 4. (1992)  
 "The Banjo Lesson: Henry Ossawa Tanner", Thomas B Col, The Art of JAMA. 2014;311(17):1714–1715. doi:10.1001/jama.2013.279474
 Day 81 – The Banjo Lesson, Dr Richard Stemp
 "An African American Artist Finds His Voice in Paris During the 19th Century", Rae Alexander-Minter, Présence Africaine, no. 171, 2005, pp. 119–132.
 "Henry Ossawa Tanner's Negotiation of Race and Art: Challenging 'The Unknown Tanner.'", Naurice Frank Woods, Journal of Black Studies, vol. 42, no. 6, 2011, pp. 887–905.
 "The Advent of 'The Nigger': The Careers of Paul Laurence Dunbar, Henry O. Tanner, and Charles W. Chesnutt", Matthew Wilson, 'American Studies, vol. 43, no. 1, 2002, pp. 5–50. 
 "Henry Ossawa Tanner's Subversion of Genre", Albert Boime, The Art Bulletin, vol. 75, no. 3, 1993, pp. 415–442.

Paintings by Henry Ossawa Tanner
1893 paintings
Hampton University
Black people in art
Musical instruments in art